Pricilia Carla Yules, (born 8 July 1996) better known as Carla Yules is an Indonesian actress, professional chef, TV Host, model and beauty pageant titleholder who won the title of Miss Indonesia 2020 representing South Sulawesi. She represented Indonesia at the Miss World 2021 pageant, where she placed in the Top 6 along with the Miss World Asia & Oceania title. Yules is the fourth Indonesians to win the Miss World Asia & Oceania title, she also the tenth Indonesian to be placed as a finalist in Miss World history, 10 years in a row placement.

Early life and education

Yules was born in Surabaya, East Java - Indonesia to an Indonesian-Dutch father, Frederick (Fredy) Yules and a Chinese Indonesian mother, Yunny Chandra from Makassar, South Sulawesi. After finishing her Senior High School study, Yules and her family migrated to Melbourne, Victoria - Australia at the age of sixteen to pursue her culinary study and modeling career, also she started her foray in acting career at age of 16.

Yules finish her Junior High School in St. Agnes Catholic Junior High School together with interior-architect Davidson Laksono Lim, and continuing her Senior High School study at Frateran Catholic Senior High School in Surabaya, East Java - Indonesia, where she was a house captain and a school chorister. She took up her bachelor degree Hons. in Hospitality management studies in the William Angliss Institute of TAFE at Melbourne, Victoria - Australia, and Entrepreneurship Summer Course Program in the same university as well.

Furthermore, Yules was a celebrity chef back in Indonesia, She is appear on several episodes on the competitive cooking reality show MasterChef Indonesia Season 6 as one of the guest judge in 2019. Yules is currently working in an organization called Mission Australia and Wrap with Love in Melbourne, Victoria, Australia since January 2016, she gets involved in social activities by volunteering to cook at a homeless shelter. She is also working in other organizations like MNC Peduli Indonesia.

Pageantry

Miss Indonesia 2020 
Yules starting her foray into the world of pageantry began in 2020 when she competed at the 16th edition of Miss Indonesia national beauty pageant in Jakarta at the age of twenty-four. Yules represented her mother home province South Sulawesi on the Miss Indonesia 2020 beauty pageant, and she won Miss Indonesia 2020, beating the other 33 contestants from other provinces across Indonesia.

During the final question and answer round, the top 5 contestants were each given different topics to speak about, which the contestants themselves picked through the draw. The question asked by Indonesian Business conglomerate, Media tycoon and Politician, Liliana Tanaja Tanoesoedibjo who sit as the President and chief executive officer of MNC Group and Miss Indonesia Organization; "Knowledge will give you power, but character gives you respect, can you elaborate this sentence?," asked Liliana. Yules answer;

The grand finale of Miss Indonesia 2020 pageant was held in MNC Studio, Jakarta - Indonesia, on 20 February 2020. Yules was crowned by the outgoing titleholder of Miss Indonesia 2019 and the Miss World 2019 top 40 finalist, Princess Mikhaelia Audrey Megonondo of Jambi. The president of Miss World organization Julia Morley and Miss World 2016, Toni-Ann Singh of Jamaica attended the awarding night.

 Miss World 2021 
As Miss Indonesia 2020, Yules represented Indonesia at the 70th edition of the Miss World 2021 pageant, held in Coca-Cola Music Hall, San Juan, Puerto Rico, on March 16, 2022. During the pageant pre-quarantine, Yules won several aawards, she is winning "Head To Head Challenge (Group 2)" advance to the Top 27 semifinal round of The "Miss World Talent" Fast Track by showcasing Pakarena Dance and traditional Buginese cloths, Bodo blouse and Sarong.

On December 14, Miss World Indonesia Organization announce that Yules tested positive for COVID-19. As a precaution, her roommate Miss World India Manasa Varanasi and five others were classified as suspected cases. Miss World Organization chairwoman Julia Morley confirmed that the delegates are currently isolated and in quarantine and that they will not be on stage for the final show if they do not produce a negative PCR test.

The rescheduled 70th Miss World pageant would take place on March 16, 2022 via Miss World social media accounts on December 22, and would be held at Puerto Rico's Coca-Cola Music Hall instead of the José Miguel Agrelot Coliseum, and 40 semifinalists had returned to Puerto Rico on March 9–11, 2022 for the rescheduled event, where Yules advancing to the Top 40 Semifinalists.

Yules concluded her Miss World journey as a Top 6 finalists, beating other countries in the group with her Gender equality, Racial equality and Social equality answer;

At the Finale, Yules was placed in the "Top 6 finalists" and was also declared as the winner of "Miss World Asia & Oceania" in the finale coronation night of the pageant. This is the tenth consecutive year (a decade) Indonesia placed in the semifinalist, also the third time Indonesia placed in the Top 6 of Miss World history and the third highest placement Indonesia has ever achieved since Maria Harfanti and Natasha Mannuela Halim both placed as the second runner-up consecutively in 2015 and 2016. Yules is the fourth Indonesians to win the "Miss World Asia & Oceania"'' title. Toni-Ann Singh of Jamaica crowned her successor Karolina Bielawska of Poland as the new titleholder at the end of the event.

Filmography
Yules has appeared on several music videos as a model and co-singer. She has acted in television show and talkshow.

Television and Talk shows

Music videos

Awards and nomination

See also 

 Miss Indonesia 2020
 Miss World 2022

References

External links

 

1996 births
Living people
Indo people
Technical and further education
Miss Indonesia winners
Indonesian beauty pageant winners
Indonesian female models
Indonesian activists
Indonesian Christians
Indonesian chefs
Indonesian television personalities
Women chefs
Indonesian people of Chinese descent
Indonesian people of Dutch descent
Health activists
Elder rights activists
People from Surabaya
Miss World 2021 delegates